Jacek Piekara (born 19 May 1965 in Kraków, Poland) is a Polish fantasy writer. He has published novels and short stories. He is known for his stories about inquisitor Mordimer Madderdin, which as of 2011 are collected in seven books.

Piekara collaborated on the script of the computer game The Prince and the Coward, in which the protagonist Arivald is a character of his stories. Under pen name Jack de Craft he wrote also a novel about Conan the Barbarian titled Conan. Pani Śmierć.

External links
 Blog

1965 births
Living people
Writers from Kraków
Polish fantasy writers